Swinging Hollywood is a 1994 album by drummer Pete York featuring jazz and pop standards and music from film soundtracks.

Track listing 

"When You Wish Upon A Star" (Leigh Harline, Ned Washington)
"Lullaby of Broadway" (Harry Warren, Al Dubin)
"In a Mellow Tone" (Duke Ellington, Milt Gabler)
"Have You Met Miss Jones" (Richard Rodgers, Lorenz Hart)
"Peter Gunn" (Henry Mancini)
"My Heart Belongs to Daddy" (Cole Porter)
"Route 66" (Bobby Troup)
"The Wizard of Oz" Medley (Harold Arlen, E.Y. "Yip" Harburg)
"You Are So Beautiful" (Billy Preston, Bruce Fisher)
"Cry Me a River" (Arthur Hamilton)
"Cute" (Neal Hefti, Stanley Styne)
"The Flintstones" (Hoyt Curtin, William Hanna, Joseph Barbera)
"As Time Goes By" (Herman Hupfeld)

Personnel 

Wolfgang Dahlheimer - keyboards
Dick Morrissey - saxophone
Roy Williams - trombone
Harvey Weston - bass
Pete York - drums, vocals
Chris Farlowe - vocals
Miller Anderson - vocals
Bea Gebauer - vocals

1994 albums